Kolvanaq (also Romanized as Kolvānaq; also known as Kolvānag, Kalvānā, Kilvana, and Kolvānā) is a city in the Central District of Heris County, East Azerbaijan province, Iran. At the 2006 census, its population was 6,344 in 1,456 households. The following census in 2011 counted 6,792 people in 1,827 households. The latest census in 2016 showed a population of 7,465 people in 2,111 households.

References 

Heris County

Cities in East Azerbaijan Province

Populated places in East Azerbaijan Province

Populated places in Heris County